Tua sorella è una puttana

Ma tua sorella in cariola

Che ne dici di fare una cosa a tre con tua sorella?

See also
List of Italian television series

Italian television series